The Minitel was a videotex online service accessible through telephone lines, and was the world's most successful online service prior to the World Wide Web. It was invented in Cesson-Sévigné, near Rennes in Brittany, France.

The service was rolled out experimentally on 15 July 1980 in Saint-Malo, France, and from autumn 1980 in other areas, and introduced commercially throughout France in 1982 by the PTT (Postes, Télégraphes et Téléphones; divided since 1991 between France Télécom and La Poste). From its early days, users could make online purchases, make train reservations, check stock prices, search the telephone directory, have a mail box, and chat in a similar way to what is now made possible by the World Wide Web.

In February 2009, France Télécom indicated the Minitel network still had 10 million monthly connections. France Télécom retired the service on 30 June 2012.

Name 
Officially TELETEL, the name Minitel is abbreviated from the French title of Médium interactif par numérisation d'information téléphonique (Interactive medium for digitized information by telephone).

Business model

In 1978, Postes, Télégraphes et Téléphones, the French PTT organisation, began designing the Minitel network. By distributing terminals that could access a nationwide electronic directory of telephone and address information, it hoped to increase use of the country's 23 million phone lines, and reduce the costs of printing phone books and employing directory assistance personnel. Millions of terminals were given for free (officially loans, and property of the PTT) to telephone subscribers. At the time, France was undergoing a vision of socialism, where the state would develop high technology for the benefit of its citizens' lives. The TGV high-velocity trains also resulted from this vision.

The telephone company emphasized ease of use; one observer wrote that "the Minitel terminal requires slightly more training than a toaster to operate". By offering a popular service on simple, free equipment, Minitel achieved high market penetration and avoided the chicken and the egg problem that prevented widespread adoption of such a system in the United States. In exchange for the terminal, Minitel owners would only be given the yellow pages (classified commercial listings, with advertisements). The white pages were accessible for free on Minitel, and they could be searched much faster than flipping through a paper directory.

A trial with just 55 residential and business telephone customers using experimental terminals began in Saint-Malo on 15 July 1980, two days after a 13 July presentation by Minitel to President Valéry Giscard d'Estaing. This expanded to 2,500 customers in other regions in autumn 1980. Starting in May 1981, 4,000 experimental terminals with a different design were distributed in Ille-et-Vilaine, and commercial service using Minitel terminals began in 1982.

By early 1986 1.4 million terminals were connected to Minitel, with plans to distribute another million by the end of the year. This was met with opposition from newspapers worried about competition from an electronic network. In 1980, Ouest France wrote that Minitel would "separate people from each other and endanger social relationships". To reduce the opposition from the newspapers, they were allowed to establish the first consumer services on Minitel. Libération offered 24-hour online news, such as results from events at the 1984 Summer Olympics in Los Angeles that occurred overnight in France. Providers advertised their own services in their own publications, which helped market the overall Minitel network. Others founded newspapers solely to create Minitel services.

By 1988 three million terminals were installed, with 100,000 new units installed monthly. The telephone directory received 23 million calls monthly, with 40,000 updates daily. About 6,000 other services were available, with 250 added monthly.  France Télécom estimated that almost 9 million terminals—including web-enabled personal computers (Windows, Mac OS, and Linux)—had access to the network at the end of 1999, and that it was used by 25 million people (of a total population of 60 million). Developed by 10,000 companies, in 1996, almost 26,000 different services were available.

Minitel became a great financial success for the PTT, as using the service cost the 2022 equivalent of 30 euro cent per minute.

The telephone company only provided the white pages, otherwise building infrastructure for others to provide services. Minitel allowed access to various categories:
 phone directory (free)
 mail-order retail companies
 airline or train ticket purchases
 information services
 databases
 message boards
 online dating services
 computer games

The development of Minitel spawned the creation of many start-up companies in a manner similar to the later dot-com bubble of World Wide Web-related companies. Similarly, many of those small companies floundered because of an overcrowded market or bad business practices (lack of infrastructure for online retailers).

By 1985 games and electronic messaging were 42% of Minitel traffic, and messaging was 17% of traffic in 1988. Youths would stay up late at night playing text-based online video games on Minitel.

Messageries roses ("pink messages", adult chat services hosted by operators pretending to be receptive women) were unexpectedly very popular, embarrassing government officials who preferred to discuss growing business usage of messaging. Widespread street advertising marketed services such as "3615 Sextel", "Jane", "kiss", "3615 penthouse", and "men". They and other pornographic sites were also criticized for their possible access by minors. The government chose not to enact coercive measures, however, stating that the regulation of the online activities of children was up to parents, not the government. The government did, however, levy a tax on pornographic online services.

The adult chat services hid two secrets. Firstly, many of the services were secretly provided by conservative newspapers, who at the same time openly disapproved of such lecherous business. Secondly, most of the operators were not the scantily-clad women appearing in the advertisements, but instead men doing their daily jobs.

Finances
Payment methods
Credit card for purchases
Telephone bill for surfing time: rates depend on the sites visited

Users first subscribed to individual services, but traffic grew quickly after the telephone company offered a "kiosk" model (named after newsagent's shops). Minitel and voice charges appeared combined on the monthly telephone bill, with no breakdown of fees. Service providers received two-thirds of the  an hour that customers typically paid as of 1988. As the telephone company handled bill collection, and users who did not pay bills lost telephone service, the customer acquisition cost for service providers was low. The single bill encouraged impulse shopping, in which users intending to use one service found and used others while browsing. As users' identities and services were anonymous, Minitel use was high at work where companies paid for telephone service.

In 1985 France Télécom earned 620 million francs (approximately ) from Minitel. 2,000 private companies earned 289 million francs (about ) during the year; Libération earned 2.5 million francs (about ) from the service in September.  In the late 1990s, Minitel connections were stable at 100 million a month plus 150 million online directory inquiries, in spite of growing use of the World Wide Web.

Minitel sales in the late 1990s accounted for almost 15% of sales at La Redoute and 3 Suisses, France's biggest mail order companies. In 2005, the most popular Minitel application was Teleroute, the online real-time freight exchange, which accounted for nearly 8% of Minitel usage.

In December 1985 Minitel users made more than 22 million calls, up 400% in one year. In 1994 they made 1,913 million Minitel calls, used the system for 110 million hours, and spent 6.6 billion francs. There were still six million terminals owned by France Télécom, which had been left with their users in order to avoid recycling problems. The main uses were banking and financial services, which benefit from Minitel's security features, and access to professional databases. France Télécom mentions, as an example of usage, that 12 million updates to personal "carte vitale" health-care cards were made through Minitel.

In 2010,  in revenues with 85% of those revenues going to service providers.

Phonebook

The most popular service of the Minitel was the "Annuaire Electronique"; in 1985 about half of the calls on the network were to it. In May of that year a white pages directory for all 24 million telephone subscribers nationwide became available. It was accessible through the phone number 11; on 18 October 1996 (when the new French numbering system was adopted), the access to the phone directory changed to 3611. Companies could add up to 3 lines of complementary information and a "prehistoric" website. Ads to the Minitel phone directory were sold by ODA (Office d'Annonces), today Solocal / Pages Jaunes Groupe in Sèvres France. In 1991, the "Minitel Website" for the Paris Sony Stores contained already over 100 pages. Today the 3611 Minitel Directory is replaced by the online white or yellow pages.

On 11 February 2009, France Télécom and PagesJaunes announced that they were to cancel plans to end the Minitel service in March 2009. Its directory assistance service was still being accessed over a million times a month. This was before France Télécom retired the service on 30 June 2012, on account of operational cost and fewer customers due to lack of interest.

Technology

Minitel used computer terminals consisting of a text-only monochrome screen, a keyboard and a modem, packaged into a single tabletop unit. Minitel terminals could display rudimentary graphics using a set of predefined block graphics characters. Color units were later available for a fee, but remained seldom-used. Aftermarket printers were available.

Minitel used the existing Transpac network, but its popularity caused problems for the network's commercial users. After a severe disruption in June 1985, France Télécom separated business traffic from Télétel, dedicated to the Minitel service. When connecting, the Minitel's integrated modem generally dialed a short code number connecting to a PAVI (Point d'Accès VIdéotexte, "videotext access point") from the subscriber's analog telephone line. The PAVI in turn connected digitally via Transpac to the destination servers of the appropriate company or administration.

In France the most common dial number was "3615", while "3617" was used by more expensive services. Minitel services names were often prefixed with this number to identify them as such. Billboard ads at the time often consisted of nothing more than an image, a company name, and a "3615" number; the fact that a Minitel service was being advertised was then clear by implication, similarly to the use of ".com" for later web services. A notable example was in the title of the film 3615 code Père Noël, in which a child attempts to use a Minitel to call Santa Claus, only for the call to go to a local criminal; the Hollywood film Home Alone was accused of plagiarising its plot.

Minitel used a half-duplex asymmetric data transmission via its modem. It downlinked at 1200 bit/s (9 KB/min) and uplinked at 75 bit/s (0.6 KB/min). This allowed fast downloads, for the time. The system, which came to be known as "1275" was more correctly known as V.23. This system had been developed for general-purpose data communications, but was most commonly used for Minitel and equivalent services around the world.

Technically, Minitel refers to the terminals, while the network is known as Télétel.

Minitel terminals use the AZERTY keyboard most commonly used in France (as opposed to the QWERTY keyboard more common in the English-speaking world). Some early models used an ABCDEF keyboard layout instead.

Minitel and the Internet
The extent to which Minitel enhanced or hindered the development of the Internet in France is widely debated. On the one hand, it included more than a thousand services, some of which predicted common applications on the modern Internet. For example, in 1986, French university students coordinated a national strike using Minitel, demonstrating an early use of digital communication devices for participatory technopolitical ends. Alternatively, the French government's attachment to the natively developed Minitel may have slowed the adoption of the Internet in France; in the 1990s there was a peak of nine million terminals and there were still 810,000 terminals in the country in 2012. In the short term, some resources at France Telecom (now Orange) were dedicated to the development of Minitel that might have otherwise been focused on Internet development. However, France Telecom's focus on Minitel had little or no long-term effect on adoption or development of internet- and web-based companies in France; France ranks roughly equal to the US and Germany in the current penetration of high-speed internet in households.

Minitel in other countries

Belgium: Minitel was launched by Belgacom and delivered services led by Teleroute. Although it was used by businesses, it was rarely used by the public.  The main reason was that the terminals were not offered for free as in France and that usage of the service was expensive (50 Euro cents a minute). Moreover, there was never much promotion thereof by Belgacom.
Brazil: Telebrás had a teletext service called "Videotexto" or "VTX" during the 1980s and 1990s with services provided by local telephone companies such as Telesp (now part of Telefônica Vivo). Services included chats, games, telephone list search, and electronic banking, among others. The Minitel protocol is still used by some cable TV companies to provide general information to their customers.
Canada: Bell Canada experimented with a Minitel-like system known as Alex with terminals called AlexTel. The system was conceptually similar to Minitel, but used the Canadian NAPLPS protocols and North American Bell System RJ-11 standard telephone connectors. Originally launched experimentally in the Montreal area, Alex was then launched in most areas served by Bell Canada (primarily Ontario and Quebec) with offers of a free trial period and terminal. The principal information offering was the telephone directory. Although branded as a "bilingual" (English and French Canadian) service, the majority of other services offered were the experimental ones originally offered in Quebec and completely Francophone. Retention rates were reportedly close to zero. The service closed down shortly after exiting the experimental stage. Telidon was an earlier Canadian text and graphics service using the same technological underpinnings.
Finland: In 1986, PTL-Tele, then Sonera (now part of Telia Company) launched the on-line service called TeleSampo. TeleSampo included not only videotex services, but also many other Ascii-based Value Added Services (VAS). Roughly at the same time, HPY HTF (now Elisa) launched a videotex service called Infotel (fi). TeleSampo service was switched off in 2004.
Germany: "Bildschirmtext" (BTX) that existed between 1983 and 2001 is almost as old as Minitel and technically very similar, but it was largely unsuccessful because consumers had to buy expensive decoders to use it. The German postal service held a monopoly on the decoders that prevented competition and lower prices. Few people bought the boxes, so there was little incentive for companies to post content, which in turn did nothing to further box sales. When the monopoly was loosened, it was too late because PC-based online services had started to appear. Some post offices in Germany offered BTX boxes for public use, allowing access to BTX without owning a box.
Ireland: Minitel was introduced to Ireland by Eir (then called Telecom Éireann) in 1988. The system was based on the French model and Irish services were even accessible from France via the code "36 19 Irlande". A number of major Irish businesses came together to offer a range of online services, including directory information, shopping, banking, hotel reservations, airline reservations, news, weather and information services. The system was also the first platform in Ireland to offer users access to e-mail outside of a corporate setting. Despite being cutting edge for its time, the system failed to capture a large market and was ultimately withdrawn due to lack of commercial interest. The rise of the internet and other global online services in the early to mid-1990s played a major factor in the death of Irish Minitel. Minitel Ireland's terminals were technically identical to their French counterparts, except that they had a Qwerty keyboard and an RJ-11 telephone jack which is the standard telephone connector in Ireland. Terminals could be rented for 5.00 Irish pounds (6.35 euros) per month or purchased for 250.00 Irish pounds (317.43 euros) in 1992.
Italy: In 1985 the national telephone operator SIP – Società italiana per l'esercizio telefonico (now known as Telecom Italia) launched the Videotel (it) service. The system use was charged on a per-page basis. Due to the excessive cost of the hardware and the expensive services, diffusion was very low, leading to the diffusion of a FidoNet-oriented movement. The service was shut down in 1994.
Netherlands: The then state-owned phone company PTT (now KPN) operated two platforms: Viditel (nl) and Videotex Nederland (nl). The main difference was that Viditel used one big central host where Videotex NL used a central access system responsible for realizing the correct connection to the required host: owned and managed by others. Viditel was introduced on 7 August 1980, and required a Vidimodem as well as a compatible home computer (one such example was the Philips P2000T which had a built-in Teletext chip) or a television set which could support Teletext; the required equipment itself would cost anywhere between 3000 and 5000 Dutch guilders overall. Viditel was shut down in September 1989 due to high operating costs and was succeeded by the cheaper and more widely used Videotex Nederland. The Videotex NL services offered access via several premium rate numbers and the information/service provider could choose the costs for accessing his service. Depending on the number used, the tariff could vary from 0–1 guilders (0.00–0.45 euro) per minute. Some private networks such as Travelnet (for travel-agencies) and RDWNet for automotive industry, used the same platform as Videotex NL but used dedicated dial-in phone numbers, dedicated access-hardware and also used authentication. Although the protocol used in France for Minitel was slightly different from the international standard one could use the "international" terminal (or PC's with the correct terminal-emulation software) to access the French services. It was possible to connect to most French Minitel services via the Dutch Videotex NL network, but the price per minute was considerably higher: most French Minitel services were reachable via the dial-in number 06-7900 which had a tariff of 1 guilder/minute (approx. €0,45/minute). Videotex Nederland was eventually shut down in 1997, and the parent company behind Videotex Nederland was subsequently renamed as Planet Media Group.
Singapore: Singapore Teleview was first trialled by the Telecom Authority of Singapore (now Singtel) beginning in 1987, and was formally launched in 1991. The Teleview system, while similar in concept to the Minitel and Prestel, was unique in that it was able to display photographic images instead of graphical images used by Minitel and Prestel. Teleview was eventually rendered obsolete by SLIP/PPP-based modem Internet connections in the late 1990s.
South Africa: Videotex was introduced by Telkom in 1986 and named Beltel. The Minitel was introduced later to popularise the service.
Spain: Videotex was introduced by Telefónica in 1990 and named Ibertex. The Ibertex was based on the French model but used the German Bildschirmtext CEPT-1 profile.
Sweden: Swedish state-owned telephone company Televerket (now Telia Company) introduced a similar service, called Teleguide (sv), in 1991. Teleguide was shut down in 1993 due to a contract dispute between Televerket and the vendors IBM and Esselte.
United Kingdom: The Prestel system was similar in concept to Minitel, using dedicated terminals or software on personal computers to access the network. The number of Prestel subscribers only reached 90 thousand.
United States: In 1991, France Télécom launched a Minitel service called "101 Online" in San Francisco; this venture was not successful. In the early 1990s US West (subsequently Qwest and now CenturyLink) launched a Minitel service in the Minneapolis and Omaha markets called "CommunityLink". This joint venture of US West and France Télécom provided Minitel content to IBM PC, Commodore 64 and Apple II owners using a Minitel-emulating software application over a dialup modem. Many of the individual services were the same as or similar to those offered by France Télécom to the French market; in fact, some chat services linked up with France Télécom's network in France. The service was fairly short-lived as competing offerings from providers like AOL, Prodigy, and CompuServe provided more services targeted at American users for a lower price. Many of US West's Minitel offerings were charged à la carte or hourly while competitors offered monthly all-inclusive pricing. In 1983, the publishing company Knight-Ridder and AT&T offered a competing service called Viewtron. The service offered news, aviation schedules and educative content, but no way of mail communication, as the publishing company thought communication should be one-way only.

See also
 History of the World Wide Web
 Internet in France
 Singapore Teleview

References

External links

 The official website 
 Minitel.org – Memories of Minitel and X.25 networks 
 Computer Chronicles: High Tech France, video circa 1990
 The French Minitel: Is There Digital Life Outside of the "US ASCII" Internet? A Challenge or Convergence?, D-Lib Magazine, December 1995
 Wired News: Minitel – The Old New Thing, April 2001
 CNN Tech: Minitel – the Beta Internet Breaks Out, April 2001
 BBC News: France's Minitel: 20 years young, 14 May 2003
 Forbes.com: The French Minitel Goes Online, 14 July 2003
 New York Times: On the Farms of France, the Death of a Pixelated Workhorse, 27 June 2012
 The Atlantic: Minitel, the Open Network Before the Internet. A state-run French computer service from the 1980s offers a cautionary tale about too much reliance on today’s private internet providers., 16 June 2017
Minitel Research Lab, USA

Communications in France
Orange S.A.
Legacy systems
Videotex
Information appliances
Pre–World Wide Web online services
1978 establishments in France
2012 disestablishments in France
E-commerce in France